The Aztec High School shooting was a school shooting and murder-suicide perpetrated by 21-year-old former student William Atchison at approximately 8:00 a.m. on December 7, 2017, in Aztec, New Mexico, United States.  Atchison entered the school in the morning disguised as a current student and hid in the school restroom.  He was discovered before he could launch a major attack, but shot and killed two students before killing himself.  Investigators believe that the quick actions of the teachers in barricading doors to the classrooms helped prevent mass casualties.

Background

Aztec, New Mexico

Aztec is a small town in San Juan County, in northwest New Mexico, on the outer edge of the Four Corners region of the state, near the Navajo Nation. The town is located in the heart of the San Juan Basin, which is known for its petroleum and natural gas deposits. In 2017, the town had a population of about 6,500 people, with 900 students enrolled at Aztec High School. According to the Department of Education, in 2013, Aztec's student body was measured at 26% Hispanic and almost 20% Native American.

William Edward Atchison
William Edward Atchison was born on March 18, 1996.  He lived in Belen, New Mexico, before moving to Aztec with his family. William was known by the nickname "Bill" and attended Aztec High School nearby. According to his father and a former co-worker, Atchison was bullied in school.  In one incident, he was allegedly attacked during a welding class and stabbed in the chest. Atchison attended sessions with school counselors for many years, and was seeing one regularly in Farmington until the counselor retired. He saw a new counselor two more times, but suddenly stopped.

A neighbor called the Aztec police on Atchison twice, once for firing his airsoft pellet gun at their dogs, and a second time for threatening to shoot her husband over an argument.  Because of these disputes, the neighbor refused to allow her sons to play with Atchison.

Atchison was suspended from high school on March 9, 2012, for using the classroom whiteboard to "memorialize" the Columbine High School massacre.  He never returned to school after the suspension, and dropped out on August 20 of that same year. After leaving school, Atchison worked at a local Giant gas station near his home. In online postings written in 2014, he described his frustration with life in rural New Mexico and his bleak career prospects. Atchison called his father a "fat lazy idiot who watches Fox News all day" and his mother "a psycho hillbilly drunk from Florida who's really mentally ill."

Online activity 

Atchison's online activity included writing pro-Hitler and pro-Trump posts on internet forums forums such as 4chan and Kiwi Farms, as well as white nationalist websites like The Daily Stormer.  He used various usernames, such as "Future Mass Shooter", "Adam Lanza", "FuckYou" on Kiwi Farms and "AlGore" on Encyclopedia Dramatica. He often joked about school shootings, such as the Columbine High School massacre. He also posted on "The Columbine High School Massacre Discussion Forum", under the usernames, "FIBAgent", and "Seung Hui-cho". Atchinson was also interested in Jeff Weise, the perpetrator of the 2005 Red Lake shootings.

In early 2016, Atchison began directly communicating with 18-year-old David Sonboly, who several months later would become the Munich mass shooter in July of that year, killing nine and injuring 36, culminating in his own suicide at the end.  Police later concluded that Sonboly was partly driven by "radical right-wing" motives.

Together, Atchison and Sonboly participated in a Steam chat group called the "Anti-Refugee Club".  The group was initially created on January 10, 2016, with Atchison as co-founder. In the chat group, gunmen and far-right domestic terrorists like Anders Breivik were stylized as heroes, and group members shared fantasies of killing directed against "non-Aryans", people of color, migrants, Jews, and refugees. The group communicated about weapons and mass murder as well as multiplayer first-person shooter video games such as Counter-Strike.  Political scientist Florian Hartleb described the group as a "virtual, international network of potential mass murderers".

After the Munich shooting in July 2016, Atchison wrote an epitaph to Sonboly on Encyclopedia Dramatica, calling him a "true Aryan" and "true German".

March 2016 FBI investigation

Atchison had no previous criminal record; however, he was investigated by the FBI in March 2016, due to his online posts indicating his interest in purchasing weapons for a mass shooting. He came to the attention of the FBI when he asked on an internet forum "where to find cheap assault rifles for a mass shooting." Atchison told FBI investigators that he was simply "trolling", and the investigation was subsequently closed when it was determined that, other than an airsoft pellet gun, Atchison did not own a firearm.

Planning and preparation
In November 2017, Atchison traveled to Sportsman's Warehouse in Farmington, where he legally purchased a 9mm Glock 19 Gen4 semi-automatic pistol that he would later use in the December attack on the school. Several weeks before the attack, Atchison visited Aztec High School to do surveillance.  He was escorted around the school and given a tour.  Atchison's father later told police that his son played a video game that allowed him to simulate a practice run of the school shooting. A timeline for the killings was found in Atchison's home, with the last entry being "8[a.m.] Die." A thumb drive discovered on his person contained the same schedule.  The night before the shooting, Aztec police officers filled up their patrol vehicles with gas at the station where Atchison was working and spoke with him as a matter of casual discourse, not noticing anything suspicious. At 6:51 a.m. on the day of the attack, Atchison composed a short suicide note.

Shooting 
On December 7, 2017, at approximately 8:00 a.m., Atchison entered Aztec High School disguised as a student.  He carried a backpack containing a 9mm Glock 19 Gen4 semi-automatic pistol. Atchison opened fire in the upper level hallway of the 800-900 student occupied building. The school custodian, Thomas "Emery" Hill, chased after Atchison, shouting, "active shooter," "lock down!" Katie Potter, a 74-year-old substitute teacher, heard the gunshots and the following loudspeaker announcement calling for a lock-down. As a substitute teacher, Ms. Potter did not have keys to the classroom, so she ushered her 17 students into the classroom office, and barricaded the door with a couch. Atchison fired multiple rounds through the office wall, and then fatally shot himself. San Juan County Sheriff Ken Christensen credited Potter's swift action with saving many lives.

Two students were confirmed dead, along with the shooter. State authorities confirmed that there were no other injuries reported. Officials said that Aztec police received a call about the shooting about 8:00 a.m.

Students were in class at the time, and heard what they thought was someone punching the lockers. As the noise became louder, they realized it was gunfire. Teachers and students hid in locked classrooms, until they were told by officials to walk out of the room toward the back of the building and the parking lot; they were later picked up by their parents at McGee Park.

Casualties

Casey Jordan Marquez, aged 17, a senior, and Francisco "Paco" Fernandez, also aged 17, a junior, were identified as the victims. Both were student-athletes at Aztec High School. Marquez was a cheerleader, and Fernandez, a recent transfer to the school, was a football player.

Investigation
Three agencies assisted with the investigation of the shooting, including the San Juan County Sheriff's Office, the FBI, and the New Mexico State Police.  On December 15, a week after the shootings, The Daily Beast published an investigative article about the online posting history of the shooter.  Several months later, the Southern Poverty Law Center (SPLC) followed up on The Daily Beast investigation, publishing its own report asserting that the white supremacist views of the shooter were to blame for the attack.  In the report, the SPLC argued that Atchison was linked to the alt-right, in particular a pattern showing at least 13 other males with alt-right views carrying out similar attacks since 2014.  The San Juan County Sheriff's Office disputed the claim, accusing SPLC of politicizing the shooting, as they did not have a link between a possible motive and white supremacism in the case. The sheriff's office came to this conclusion based on the lack of evidence showing that Atchison's views led to him targeting the victims. The only facts that could be ascertained, the sheriff’s office said, is "that the shooter had serious issues and was hell bent on mass casualties for his own personal notoriety."

The sheriff’s office completed their investigation in August 2018, concluding that Atchison had no accomplices and no known motive for the attack.  They believe that Atchison chose the anniversary of the attack on Pearl Harbor, which occurred just before 8:00 a.m., on December 7, 1941, for the attack on the school. The Aztec Police Department gave a public presentation, overview, and detailed timeline of the shooting incident at Aztec City Hall on October 17, 2018.

Autopsy findings
The coroner's report and autopsy on Atchison revealed a self-inflicted gunshot wound to the head and bruised knuckles. Atchison's body displayed several neo-Nazi symbols and words on his skin. These symbols included a swastika, SS runes, and the acronym "AMOG" (manosphere slang for "Alpha Male of Group") on his upper thigh. The phrase "BUILD WALL" appeared above his left knee, and "your home" on the right of his groin. Atchison's toxicology report revealed that no drugs or alcohol were present in his body on the day of the shooting.

Lawsuits

The family of Casey Jordan Marquez filed two wrongful death lawsuits in response to the incident.  The first lawsuit was filed against the Aztec school district and police department on December 6, 2019.  The suit claimed administrators failed to heed the advice of a 2013 school security assessment which recommended securing the school perimeter with new infrastructure improvements such as fencing and a funneled entrance.  The lawsuit claimed the security assessment was dismissed by the superintendent and a board member as a risk that was "simply too remote" to support funding security enhancements.

The Marquez family filed a second wrongful death lawsuit on June 8, 2020. This time, the family sued the FBI, claiming that the agency was negligent in the death of her daughter and that the shooter could have been stopped if the FBI had performed a threat assessment that took into account all of the available information then known on the shooter.  For example, according to the suit, the FBI dismissed the threat without examining the student's case file held by the school, which would have shown a history of previous threats, school suspension, and psychological problems.  The agency also failed, the suit claims, to investigate the link between the shooter and David Sonboly in 2016, who would go on to kill nine people several months after the FBI conducted their initial investigation of Atchison and determined he wasn't a threat. The suit against the FBI was dismissed with prejudice on December 14, 2020.

Legacy
The incident led to New Mexico legislators funding additional school safety infrastructure for fencing and entrances.  At Aztec High School, more school resource officers were put in place, the perimeter of the school was secured, and external doors were hardened with new remote locking radio alert technology.  Additionally, there was a push by the New Mexico Police Chiefs Association to support red flag laws, which would make a school shooting a fourth degree felony.

After Marquez was murdered in the shooting, her mother started a non-profit program to award college scholarships in her honor to students in New Mexico and Colorado.

See also 

 Gun violence in the United States
 List of rampage killers in the United States
 List of school shootings in the United States
 List of school-related attacks

References

Further reading 
 
 
 
 
 
 

2017 in New Mexico
2017 murders in the United States
December 2017 crimes in the United States
High school shootings in the United States
Murder in New Mexico
Murder–suicides in the United States
2017 active shooter incidents in the United States